The Anglican Church Of St Mary in Wanstrow, within the English county of Somerset, was built in the 15th century. It is a Grade II* listed building.

The church was extended and partially rebuilt in the 19th century. The three stage tower, which was added in 1810, is supported by corner buttresses.

The parish is part of the Postlebury benefice which includes the churches in Cloford, Marston Bigot, Nunney, Wanstrow and Witham Friary within the Diocese of Bath and Wells.

References

Grade II* listed buildings in Mendip District
Church of England church buildings in Mendip District
15th-century church buildings in England
Grade II* listed churches in Somerset